Aglientu is a comune (municipality) in the Province of Sassari in the Italian region Sardinia, located about  north of Cagliari and about  northwest of Olbia.

Aglientu borders the following municipalities: Aggius, Luogosanto, Santa Teresa Gallura, Tempio Pausania, Trinità d'Agultu e Vignola.

In 2005 Aglientu hosted the Kitesurf World Cup. It is home to the Festa del Turista ("Tourist's Feast").

References

Cities and towns in Sardinia
1959 establishments in Italy
States and territories established in 1959
Articles which contain graphical timelines